Eurycrates ( Eurykrates) was the 11th Agiad dynasty king of the Greek city-state of Sparta, who was preceded by his father Polydorus followed by his son Anaxander. He ruled from 665 to 640 BC.

Sources

External links 

The Spartan experience: from the 8th century BC

7th-century BC rulers
7th-century BC Spartans
Agiad kings of Sparta
7th-century BC deaths
Year of birth unknown